Charles Lincoln Van Doren (February 12, 1926 – April 9, 2019) was an American writer and editor who was involved in a television quiz show scandal in the 1950s. In 1959 he testified before the U.S. Congress that he had been given the correct answers by the producers of the NBC quiz show Twenty-One. Terminated by NBC, he joined Encyclopædia Britannica, Inc. in 1959, becoming a vice-president and writing and editing many books before retiring in 1982.

Background

Charles Van Doren was born in New York City, the elder son of Pulitzer Prize-winning poet, critic and teacher Mark Van Doren and novelist  Dorothy Van Doren (née Graffe), and a nephew of critic and Pulitzer Prize-winning biographer Carl Van Doren. He graduated from the High School of Music & Art in New York, and earned a B.A. degree in Liberal Arts (1946) from St. John's College in Annapolis, Maryland, as well as an M.A. in astrophysics (1949) and a Ph.D. in English (1955), both at Columbia University. He was also a student at University of Cambridge in the United Kingdom.

Quiz show celebrity

On November 28, 1956, Van Doren made his first appearance on the NBC quiz show Twenty-One. Twenty-One was not Van Doren's first game show interest. He was long believed to have approached producers Dan Enright and Albert Freedman, originally, to appear on Tic-Tac-Dough, another game they produced. Van Doren eventually revealed—five decades after his Twenty-One championship and fame, in a surprise 2008 article for The New Yorker—that he did not even own a television set, but had met Freedman through a mutual friend, with Freedman initiating the idea of Van Doren going on television by way of asking what he thought of Tic-Tac-Dough.

Enright and Freedman were impressed by Van Doren's polite style and telegenic appearance, thinking the youthful Columbia teacher would be the man to defeat their incumbent Twenty-One champion, Herb Stempel, and boost the show's declining ratings as Stempel's reign continued.

In January 1957, Van Doren entered a winning streak on Twenty-One that ultimately earned him $129,000 (the equivalent of $ million today) and made him famous, including an appearance on the cover of Time on February 11, 1957. His run ended on March 11, when he lost to Vivienne Nearing, a lawyer whose husband Van Doren had previously defeated. After his defeat he was offered a three-year contract with NBC worth $150,000.

There have been numerous suggestions since that Van Doren was almost immediately offered a job as a special "cultural correspondent" for Today, hosted by Dave Garroway. However, Van Doren reminded people that his first job (though short-lived) was as a newswriter, before he began doing small pieces for a weekend cultural program, Wide Wide World, also hosted by Garroway. Those pieces quickly led to Garroway inviting Van Doren to join Today. Van Doren also made guest appearances on other NBC programs, even serving as Todays substitute host when Garroway took a brief vacation.

Scandal

When allegations of cheating were first raised by Stempel and others, Van Doren denied any wrongdoing, saying, "It's silly and distressing to think that people don't have more faith in quiz shows." As the investigation by the New York District Attorney's office and eventually the United States Congress progressed, Van Doren, now host on Today, was under pressure from NBC to testify. Instead, Van Doren went into hiding in order to avoid the congressional subpoena. It was another former Twenty-One contestant, artist James Snodgrass, who would finally provide indisputable corroborating proof that the show had been rigged. Snodgrass had documented every answer he was coached on in a series of registered letters he mailed to himself prior to the broadcast.

One month after the hearings began, Van Doren emerged from hiding and confessed before Congress that he had been complicit in the fraud. On November 2, 1959, he admitted to the House Subcommittee on Legislative Oversight, a congressional subcommittee chaired by Rep. Oren Harris (D-AR), that he had been given questions and answers in advance of the show.

Authorities differ regarding the audience's reaction to Van Doren's statement. David Halberstam writes in his book The Fifties:

By contrast, William Manchester, in his narrative history The Glory and the Dream, recounts a diametrically opposite response:

An Associated Press story dated November 2, 1959, seems to verify Halberstam's version of events:

Later career and death
Van Doren was dropped by NBC and resigned from his post as an English instructor at Columbia University. He became an editor at Praeger Books and a pseudonymous (at first) writer, before becoming an editor of the Encyclopædia Britannica and the author of several books, of which his 1991 popular-market A History of Knowledge may be his best known. Van Doren also co-authored a well-received revision of How to Read a Book with its original author, philosopher Mortimer J. Adler, and co-edited with him a 1,771-page anthology titled Great Treasury of Western Thought (1977). He had already worked with Adler on an 18-volume collection of documents covering American history, entitled The Annals of America (1968), which was accompanied by a two-volume, 1,300-page "topical index" organized around 25 themes and entitled Great Issues in American Life: A Conspectus.

In his 2008 article in The New Yorker, Van Doren revealed that he had actually been contemplating the Britannica job even at the height of his celebrity. His father had suggested the possibility to him during a long walk around the farmlands they both loved. The elder Van Doren mentioned to his son that Adler, the philosopher and a member of Britannicas board of editors, had spoken of making Van Doren its editor-in-chief. Van Doren eventually accepted the job, he would write, by way of intercession from a former college roommate. Van Doren retired from Britannica in 1982.

Van Doren also revealed he had been offered an opportunity to participate in a PBS series on the history of philosophy, but that its tentative producer, Julian Krainin, might actually have had in mind Van Doren's explicit cooperation on a planned PBS program recalling the quiz show scandals. When that did not occur (though the program thanked Van Doren explicitly, among other credits), he wrote, Krainin later sought his cooperation and consultation when Robert Redford was beginning to make Quiz Show—even conveying that Van Doren would be paid in six figures for it. After wrestling with the idea—and, he wrote, noting his wife's objections—Van Doren rejected it. Van Doren finally broke his silence on the quiz show scandal in the New Yorker article.

Van Doren had refused interviews or public comment on the subject of the quiz show scandals. In a 1985 interview on Today—his only appearance on the program since his dismissal in 1959, promoting his book The Joy of Reading—he answered a general question on how the scandal changed his life. He revisited Columbia University only twice in the forty years that followed his resignation—in 1984 when his son John graduated; and in 1999 at a reunion of Columbia's Class of 1959. During the latter appearance, Van Doren made one allusion to the quiz scandal without mentioning it by name:

In 2005, Van Doren joined the faculty of the University of Connecticut, Torrington; the campus was closed in 2016. Van Doren spent the last years of his life with his wife, Gerry, in a "small, old house" (his words) on the land his parents bought in Cornwall, Connecticut, in the 1920s. 

Van Doren died in a retirement community of natural causes in Canaan, Connecticut, on April 9, 2019 at the age of 93. His opponent he defeated to win his first game of Twenty One, Herb Stempel died on April 7, 2020, almost exactly one year after Van Doren's death, and at the same age; Stempel's death was not publicly announced until nearly two months later.

Cultural references

"The Quiz Show Scandal"
"The Quiz Show Scandal" is a documentary that first aired on PBS on January 6, 1992, as an episode of the fourth season of American Experience. Produced by Julian Krainin and Michael R. Lawrence, the one-hour program explored the corruption of the 1950s quiz show scandals, particularly that involving Van Doren and Twenty-One. Van Doren spoke with the producers but eventually declined to participate in the program. "The Quiz Show Scandal" was one of the most popular episodes of the series.

Quiz Show film
The story of the quiz show scandal and Van Doren's role in it is depicted in the 1994 film Quiz Show, produced and directed by Robert Redford, in which Van Doren is portrayed by Ralph Fiennes. The film made $24 million by April 1995, and was nominated for Academy Awards in the categories of Best Picture, Best Director, Best Actor in a Supporting Role, and Best Adapted Screenplay.

The film earned several critiques questioning its use of dramatic license, its accuracy, and the motivation behind its making. The movie's critics have included Joseph Stone, the New York prosecutor who began the investigations; and Jeffrey Hart, a Dartmouth College scholar and senior editor of National Review; and a longtime friend of Van Doren, who saw the film as falsely implying tension between Van Doren and his accomplished father.

Freedomland U.S.A.: The Definitive History
Van Doren is mentioned in a book, Freedomland U.S.A.: The Definitive History (Theme Park Press, 2019), that references his connection to the now-defunct Freedomland U.S.A. theme park that was located in The Bronx in New York City. He was the emcee for the groundbreaking event for the park on August 26, 1959.

Rigged on a Fix
Charles Van Doren and 1950s quiz show scandals were referenced in the track Rigged on a Fix from the album Rancid (2000 album) by the American punk rock band Rancid (band).

Published works

Books
 1957: Lincoln's Commando: The Biography of Commander W. B. Cushing, U.S.N. (with Ralph J. Roske). 
 1959: Letters to Mother; An Anthology (editor). 
 1968: The Annals of America, 20 volumes, (executive editor, with Mortimer J. Adler, editor in chief). 
 1969: The Negro in American History, three volumes (editor, with Mortimer J. Adler, general editor; George Ducas, executive editor). 
 1972: How to Read a Book: The Classic Guide to Intelligent Reading, with Mortimer J. Adler; updated and rewritten version of the book originally published by Adler in 1940. 
 1977: Great Treasury of Western Thought, co-edited with Mortimer J. Adler. 
 1980: Shakespeare: Reading and Talking. 
 1984: Webster's American Biographies (editor, with Robert McHenry, associate editor). 
 1985: The Joy of Reading. 
 1991: A History of Knowledge: Past, Present and Future. 
 2013: The Lion of Cortona: A Novel of the Middle Ages (three volumes).

Articles

"All the Answers"
The July 28, 2008, issue of The New Yorker included a personal reminiscence titled "All the Answers", written by Van Doren, in which he recounted in detail the scandals and their aftermath. Other than very occasional and often very abbreviated references to it, Van Doren had never before spoken publicly about the scandal, his role, and its effects on his life.

He referred to the film Quiz Show, saying he was bothered most by the closing credits' reference that he never taught again: "I didn't stop teaching, though it was a long time before I taught again in a college." But he also said he enjoyed John Turturro's portrayal of his Twenty-One rival, Herb Stempel.

The article also contradicted many impressions of Van Doren that the film had created: the film portrayed him as a bachelor when he was actually engaged; it suggested he had a fascination with the burgeoning, popular television quiz shows when in fact he did not even own a television set; that the only reason he became even mildly acquainted with Twenty-One was because co-producer Al Freedman shared a mutual acquaintance with one of Van Doren's friends; and that he had been offered his job with Today promptly after losing to Vivien Nearing when, in fact, NBC was not sure at first what to do with him, until he did work for Dave Garroway's Sunday afternoon cultural show, Wide Wide World, which then led to the invitation to join Today.

Van Doren also addressed and denied the film's insinuations that he had been friends with Congressional investigator Richard Goodwin while Van Doren was Twenty-Ones reigning champion (and during and after the start of Herb Stempel's efforts to expose the show's being rigged). According to Van Doren, the two men had not met until August 1959, when the subcommittee Goodwin served as counsel for had begun investigating the quiz shows and Van Doren was already established on The Today Show.

References

Further reading
 Thomas Doherty, "Quiz Show Scandals," The Museum of Broadcast Communications.
 Jeffrey Hart, "'Van Doren' and 'Redford'," National Review, 7 November 1994.
 Lina Lofaro, "Charles Van Doren Vs. the Quiz Show Dream Team," Time, 19 September 1994.
 Robert Metz, CBS: Reflections in a Bloodshot Eye. (Chicago: Playboy Press, 1973.)
 Joseph Stone, Prime-time and Misdemeanors: Investigating the 1950s TV Quiz Scandal – A D.A.'s Account. (New Brunswick, NJ: Rutgers University Press, 1992.)
 Como Ler Livros – O Guia Clássico para a Leitura Inteligente, É Realizações Editora (Brazil, 2010)

External links
Twenty-One: Full Stemple and Van Doren Episode
 "The Remarkable Van Dorens", Time, Feb. 11, 1957

1926 births
2019 deaths
Alumni of the University of Cambridge
Columbia Graduate School of Arts and Sciences alumni
Columbia University faculty
Contestants on American game shows
Encyclopædia Britannica
NBC News people
St. John's College (Annapolis/Santa Fe) alumni
Charles Van Doren
University of Connecticut faculty
Writers from New York City
The High School of Music & Art alumni
American people of Dutch descent